is a Prefectural Natural Park in the islands of Kumejima, Okinawa Prefecture, Japan. It was established in 1983 and includes a designated marine zone of 57 km².

See also
 National Parks of Japan
 Iriomote-Ishigaki National Park
 Okinawa Kaigan Quasi-National Park

References

External links
  Detailed map of the Park

Parks and gardens in Okinawa Prefecture
Protected areas established in 1983
1983 establishments in Japan
Kumejima, Okinawa